Pseudonocardia acaciae is a Gram-positive bacterium from the genus of Pseudonocardia which has been isolated from roots of the tree Acacia auriculiformis in Bangkok on Thailand.

References

Pseudonocardia
Bacteria described in 2009